Ahmed Merza Musa Ahmed (born 21 February 1991) is a Bahraini footballer who plays as a midfielder for Al-Hidd and the Bahrain national team.

Career
Merza was included in Bahrain's squad for the 2019 AFC Asian Cup in the United Arab Emirates.

Career statistics

International

References

External links
 
 
 
 
 Ahmed Merza at WorldFootball.com

1991 births
Living people
Sportspeople from Manama
Bahraini footballers
Bahrain international footballers
Association football midfielders
Riffa SC players
Hidd SCC players
Bahraini Premier League players
2019 AFC Asian Cup players